Nerston on the R65 road in Mpumalanga is a border post between South Africa and Eswatini. The Eswatini side of the border is known as Sandlane, and the road leading into Eswatini is the MR19. The border is open between 08:00 and 18:00

References

Eswatini–South Africa border crossings